Deir Nidham is a Palestinian village in the Ramallah and al-Bireh Governorate in the central West Bank. According to the Palestinian Central Bureau of Statistics (PCBS) 2007 census, the town had a population of 879.

Location
It is bordered by Umm Safa and Kobar  to the east, Nabi Salih and Bani Zeid to the north, 'Abud and Bani Zeid  to the west, and Al-Itihad to the south.

History
Sherds have been found here from the   Byzantine,  Crusader/Ayyubid and  Mamluk eras.

Ottoman era
The population was 4 households, all Muslim. They paid a fixed tax rate of 25%  on agricultural products, which included wheat, barley,  olive trees, vineyards and fruit trees, goats and beehives in addition to "occasional revenues"; a total of 1200 akçe. Sherds from the early   Ottoman era has also been found here.

In 1863 Victor Guérin visited and described it as being  half ruined and inhabited only by a hundred fellahins. Several cisterns, partially filled, and a number of antique stones, scattered on the ground or reused, proved to him  that it  had succeeded a former locality. An Ottoman  village list from about 1870 found that the village had  a population of 59, in a total of  17  houses, though the population count included men, only.

In 1882, the PEF's Survey of Western Palestine (SWP) described it: "A small hamlet on a high point, with olives round it. It is just above the ruins of Tibneh, and water is obtained from the 'Ain Tibneh."

In 1896 the population of  Der en-nizam was estimated to be about 147 persons.

British era
In the 1922 census of Palestine conducted by the British Mandate authorities, Deir Nidham (Dair Inzam) had a population of 106  Muslims.  increasing in the  1931 census when Deir Nizam had   166  Muslims  in 34 houses.

In  the  1945 statistics  the population was 190 Muslims, while the total land area was 1,938  dunams, according to an official land and population survey. Of  this,  514  were  plantations and irrigable land, 483  for cereals, while 31 dunams were classified as built-up areas.

Jordanian era
In the wake of the 1948 Arab–Israeli War, and after the 1949 Armistice Agreements, Deir Nidham came  under Jordanian rule.

The Jordanian census of 1961 found 267 inhabitants.

1967-present
Since the Six-Day War in 1967, Deir Nidham  has been under  Israeli occupation. The population in the 1967 census conducted by the Israeli authorities was 216.

After  the 1995 accords, 4.7% of village land is defined as Area B land, while the remaining 95.3 is defined as Area C. In 1997 Israel  confiscated 604 dunums of village land for the Israeli settlement of Halamish.

A secondary school exists in Deir Nidham and high school students are educated at a nearby village. Most university students attend Birzeit University or the al-Quds Open University. The electricity network in the village is affiliated with that of Jerusalem, while its water network is managed by the Palestinian National Authority. A village council of seven members was established in 2005 to govern the village.

References

Bibliography

External links
   Official Website
Welcome to Dayr Nidham
Survey of Western Palestine, Map 14:  IAA, Wikimedia commons 
Deir Nidham village (fact sheet),  Applied Research Institute–Jerusalem (ARIJ)
Deir Nidham village profile, ARIJ
 Deir Nidham, aerial photo, ARIJ
Locality Development Priorities and Needs in Deir Nidham Village, ARIJ

Ramallah and al-Bireh Governorate
Villages in the West Bank
Municipalities of the State of Palestine